Jeffrey Graham Jeffreys (1893–1977) was an Australian schoolteacher who moved to England and founded Bryanston School in Dorset.

Jeffreys first taught in Australia.  He came to England in 1921 to teach chemistry at Westminster School in London. The headmaster of the school encouraged him to take a second degree at Christ Church, Oxford. He then taught at Radley School just south of Oxford. However, he wished to found his own school.  In Dorset, there were two options, Brownsea Island in Poole Harbour and Bryanston. The Earl of Shaftesbury offered financial backing and to be the Chairman of Governors. In 1928, Jeffreys founded Bryanston School as the "Master", with seven assistants and 23 boys aged between 13 and 16. He chose the school crest (a rising sun) and the school motto Et Nova Et Vetera (Latin for "Both New and Old").

Jeffreys promoted the Dalton Plan, which was at that time still quite new, at Bryanston. The Dalton Plan was originally developed by the American teacher Helen Parkhurst at Dalton High School in Massachusetts in the 1920s. It combined old and new approaches, hence the school motto.

There was some friction with the governors, and Jeffreys resigned in 1931, taking up a post at Ottershaw College in Surrey.

References 

1893 births
1977 deaths
Australian schoolteachers
Alumni of Christ Church, Oxford
Headmasters of Bryanston School
Australian emigrants to the United Kingdom